The 1895–96 Drexel Blue and Gold men's basketball team represented Drexel Institute of Art, Science and Industry during the 1895–96 men's basketball season. The Blue and Gold, led by 1st year head coach F. Knight, played their home games at Main Building.

Roster

Schedule

|-
!colspan=9 style="background:#F8B800; color:#002663;"| Regular season
|-

References

Drexel Dragons men's basketball seasons
Drexel
Drexel
Drexel